Ekkamai station is a BTS skytrain station, on the Sukhumvit line in Phra Khanong Nuea Subdistrict, Watthana District and Phra Khanong Subdistrict, Khlong Toei District, Bangkok, Thailand. The station opened on 5 December 1999 along with the rest of the Sukhumvit Line's first phase. The elevated station is located on Sukhumvit Road at Soi Ekkamai (Soi Sukhumvit 63) next to the eastern bus terminal to eastern provinces. Bangkok Planetarium, the oldest planetarium in the country is next to the station within the Science Centre for Education.

Facilities
 Next to the BTS station is the Ekkamai Eastern Bus Terminal to Chon Buri, Pattaya, Rayong.
For shopping, this station has a direct connection to Major Cineplex Sukhumvit, home to a modern cinema, bowling alley, karaoke lounges and a modest mall, as well as the Japanese concept mall, Gateway, with many Japanese-inspired eateries.

See also
 Bangkok Skytrain

References

BTS Skytrain stations